Sabrina Celeste Barbitta Nuño (born 22 May 1979), known as Celeste Barbitta, is an Argentine footballer who plays as a defender. She was a member of the Argentina women's national team at two FIFA Women's World Cup editions (2003 and 2007).

References

1979 births
Living people
Argentine women's footballers
Footballers from Buenos Aires
Women's association football defenders
Argentina women's international footballers
2003 FIFA Women's World Cup players
2007 FIFA Women's World Cup players
Pan American Games competitors for Argentina
Footballers at the 2007 Pan American Games
Boca Juniors (women) footballers
Racing Club (women) players